The 1971–72 Challenge Cup was the 71st staging of rugby league's oldest knockout competition, the Challenge Cup.
The final was contested by St. Helens and Leeds at Wembley.

First round

Second round

Quarter-finals

Semi-finals

Final
The final was played on Saturday 13 May 1972, in front of a crowd of 89,495. After leading 12-6 at half time, St Helens beat Leeds 16-13.

The winner of the Lance Todd Trophy was Saints’ Kel Coslett.

St Helens scorers were Les Jones (1 try), Graham Rees (1 try), and Kel Coslett (5 goals).

This was St Helens’ fourth Cup final win in eight Final appearances.

References

External links
Challenge Cup official website 
Challenge Cup 1971/72 results at Rugby League Project

Challenge Cup
Challenge Cup